Frank Mathiesen (born 13 February 1969) is a retired Norwegian football defender.

A club legend in Aalesund, he joined them from Ørskog ahead of the 1988 season. The club was a mainstay on the second tier, but Mathiesen got the chance at Vålerenga from 1992 through 1994, the last season on the first tier.  He rejoined Aalesund and finally got to represent the club in Eliteserien in 2003, retiring post-season. He became AaFK's goalkeeper coach.

References

1969 births
Living people
People from Ørskog
Norwegian footballers
Aalesunds FK players
Vålerenga Fotball players
Norwegian First Division players
Eliteserien players
Association football goalkeepers
Aalesunds FK non-playing staff
Sportspeople from Møre og Romsdal